The Blue is a central market place in Bermondsey, southeast London. The market is open Monday to Saturday from 9am until 5pm and has about 10 stall holders, selling food and clothes. The area has been known locally as The Blue for more than two hundred and thirty years and is probably named after the original Blue Anchor public house that gave its name to Blue Anchor Lane. The market has capacity for 24 stalls.

Immediately north of Blue Anchor Lane on an arched viaduct are the multiple railway tracks of the Brighton and South East Main Lines. The Blue Anchor Lane joins St. James's Road where the viaduct arches to the immediate north west contain the remnants of the disused Spa Road railway station which was the original terminus of London's first railway.

In 2005 a Metropolitan Police report described the area as a crime hotspot for "race crime and youth disorder".
In October 2014 The Blue became a Business Improvement District (BID).

References

Further reading

Art
: "a large mural project funded by Southwark, Cleaner greener safer department and organised in partnership with Community Space Challenge. We transformed a dull and neglected wall to create a large mural depicting the famous ‘Blue Market’ in the 1960s featuring a traditional scene with barrow boy and original stalls".
: "The sculpture was designed and made by local blacksmith Kevin Boys, and cost about £60,000."

Commercial

Retail markets in London
Streets in the London Borough of Southwark
Bermondsey